The 1917 Kansas Jayhawks football team was an American football team that represented the University of Kansas in the Missouri Valley Conference (MVC) during the 1917 college football season. In their third and final season under head coach Herman Olcott, the Jayhawks compiled a 6–2 record (3–1 against conference opponents), tied for second place in the MVC, and outscored opponents by a total of 126 to 46. They played their home games at McCook Field in Lawrence, Kansas. Harry Neilson was the team captain.

Schedule

References

Kansas
Kansas Jayhawks football seasons
Kansas Jayhawks football